As-Salam College of Engineering & Technology is an engineering college in Thanjavur District, India, founded in 2009. It is located in Thirumangalakudi. The college has received approval from the All India Council for Technical Education, New Delhi, and its affiliation from Anna University, Tiruchirappalli.

References

External links
 College Website 

Engineering colleges in Tamil Nadu
Colleges affiliated to Anna University
Education in Thanjavur district
Educational institutions established in 2009
2009 establishments in Tamil Nadu